The Battle of Aspindza was fought on 20 April 1770 between the Georgians, led by king of Kartli-Kakheti Erekle II, and the Ottoman Empire. The Georgians won a victory over the Turks.

Battle

The Georgian forces of Erekle were joined in 1769 by a  Russian expeditionary force under the command of general Totleben. The relationship between the two soon became strained. In the spring of 1770 they decided to move against the fortress of Akhaltsikhe, however at the last moment Totleben withdrew his forces in spite of Georgians' objections. Nevertheless, Erekle decided to give battle and defeated the Ottoman Turks with his outnumbered army. Totleben's withdrawal prevented Erekle from exploiting his victory and forced him to accept a draw.

After their defeat the Turks launched no further offensives into Georgia until the end of the war. Open strife broke down between Totleben and Erekle as the former attempted to seize control of Tbilisi and annex Georgia. Totleben moved his forces to Western Georgia and was relieved of his duties in 1771.

The battle is the subject of the patriotic ode "On the Battle of Aspindza" by Besiki.

Citations

References

General References
 

Aspindza
Aspindza
Aspindza
1770 in the Ottoman Empire
18th century in Georgia (country)
Russo-Turkish War (1768–1774)